Elizabeth Korte is an American television writer for the ABC Daytime soap opera General Hospital.

Positions held 
General Hospital
Occasional breakdown writer: 2005–2008
Script editor: 2002 – January 3, 2008, March 17, 2008–present
Associate head writer: 1998–2000, 2001 – January 3, 2008, March 17, 2008–present
Script writer: 1996–2000, 2001 – 2006
Head Writer (with Michele Val Jean): January 2001 – April 2001
Script Continuity: March 1994 – 1996

General Hospital: Night Shift
Head writer/co-creator (with Robert Guza Jr.): July 12, 2007 – October 4, 2007
Script: Frayed Anatomies

Awards and nominations
Korte has been nominated for 8 Daytime Emmy Awards (won 2) and 3 Writers Guild of America Awards (won once).

See also 
History of General Hospital
List of General Hospital characters

External links 
 ABC Daytime: GH

American screenwriters
American soap opera writers
Daytime Emmy Award winners
Living people
American women screenwriters
American women television writers
Year of birth missing (living people)
Place of birth missing (living people)
Women soap opera writers
21st-century American women